Sins of the Father is an original novel based on the U.S. television series Buffy the Vampire Slayer. Its tagline was "The past revisits both the slayer and the watcher".

Plot summary

Buffy's old boyfriend from Hemery High in LA, Pike, makes a surprise appearance in Sunnydale, much to the everyone's shock, particularly Buffy's. Only Pike hasn't come to catch up with Buffy; he's being pursued by a rock demon known as Grayhewn. Pike had originally killed the demon's mate after it had killed his friend and now the demon wants Pike dead in the most painful way possible. As soon as Pike makes his appearance though, Buffy struggles to deal with her old feelings for Pike as well as her love for Angel, creating nothing but confusion within herself. Meanwhile, Giles appears to be dating a new teacher named Miss Blaisdell. But since Giles has been seeing her, he seems to waver in and out of consciousness and doesn't appear to care at all about Buffy or her struggles. Miss Blaisdell, as it turns out, is working for a man from Giles' past, a man from his very personal past, who wants nothing more than to painfully torture the Watcher and make him suffer.

Continuity

Supposed to be set in an alternative Buffy season 3. 
The established Buffyverse canon is unclear about the happenings of Buffy pre-Sunnydale. The film, 'Buffy the Vampire Slayer' starring Kristy Swanson is not considered 'canon'. However we do know that Buffy burnt down the gym at Hemery High School. We also know that her Watcher Merrick, was killed. It is generally assumed that Pike was also part of the canon because of his presence in the Buffy comic, The Origin.
This book is notable as one of the attempts to successfully explain a continuity between Buffy at Hemery High in LA and that of Buffy at Sunnydale High. Golden uses The Origin as a basis. 
Pike's appearance is associated with the continuity established by the Buffy comics: The Origin, Viva Las Buffy, Slayer, Interrupted, and Staked through the Heart. He would also appear in Note from the Underground

Canonical issues

Buffy novels, such as this one are not considered by most fans as part of canon. They are usually not considered as official Buffyverse reality, but are novels from the authors' imaginations. However unlike fanfic, 'overviews' summarising their story, written early in the writing process, were 'approved' by both Fox and Whedon (or his office), and the books were therefore later published as officially Buffy merchandise.

External links

Reviews
Slayerlit.us - Review of this book.
Litefoot1969.bravepages.com - Review of this book by Litefoot
Nika-summers.com - Review of this book by Nika Summers
Shadowcat.name - Review of this book

1999 novels
Books based on Buffy the Vampire Slayer